was the 78th emperor of Japan, according to the traditional order of succession. His reign spanned the years from 1158 through 1165.

Genealogy 
Before his ascension to the Chrysanthemum Throne, his personal name (his imina) was Morihito-shinnō (守仁親王).

He was the eldest son of Emperor Go-Shirakawa.  He was the father of Emperor Rokujō.

Empress: Imperial Princess Yoshiko (姝子内親王) later Takamatsu-in (高松院), Emperor Toba’s daughter.
Empress: Fujiwara no Ikushi (藤原育子), Fujiwara no Tadamichi’s daughter
Tai-Kōtaigō: Fujiwara Masuko (藤原多子) Later Grand Empress Dowager Omiya, Tokudaiji Kin'yoshi's daughter.
Toku-no-Kimi (督の君), Minamoto Tadafusa’s daughter also Fujiwara no Narichika’s Wife
Kasuga-dono (春日殿), Nakahara Moromoto’s daughter
 First Daughter: Imperial Princess Yoshiko (僐子内親王; 1159-1171)
Umeryo-kimi (右馬助), Minamoto Mitsunari’s daughter
 First Son: Imperial Prince Priest Son'e (尊恵法親王; 1164-1192)
Ōkura-daisuke (大蔵大輔)
 Second Son: Imperial Prince Nobuhito (順仁親王) become Emperor Rokujo
 Minamoto Tadafusa’s daughter
 Third Son: Shine (真恵)

Events of Nijō's life
Nijō was proclaimed as heir to Emperor Go-Shirakawa.

 Hōgen 1, 2nd day of the 7th month (1156): Cloistered Emperor Toba-in died at age 54.
 Hōgen 1, 10th–29th days of the 7th month (1156): The Hōgen Rebellion, also known as the Hōgen Insurrection or the Hōgen War.
 Hōgen 4, on the 11th day of the 8th month (1158): In the third year of Go-Shirakawa-tennōs reign (後白河天皇二十五年), the emperor abdicated; and the succession (‘‘senso’’) was received by his eldest son.  Shortly thereafter, Emperor Nijō is said to have acceded to the throne (‘‘sokui’’).

After Nijō was formally enthroned, the management of all affairs continued to rest entirely in the hands of the retired emperor, Go-Shirakawa.

 Heiji 1, 9th–26th day of the 12th month (1159): The Heiji Rebellion, also known as the Heiji Insurrection or the Heiji War.
 Chōkan 2, on the 26th day of the 8th month (1164):The former-Emperor Sutoku died at the age of 46.
 Eiman 1 (1165):  The infant son of Emperor Nijō was named heir apparent and therefore Crown Prince, and would soon after become Emperor Rokujō.
 Eiman 1, on the 25th day of the 6th month (1165): In the seventh year of Nijō-tennōs reign (桓武天皇七年), the emperor fell so very ill that he abdicated; and the succession (‘‘senso’’) was received by his son.  Shortly thereafter, Emperor Rokujō is said to have acceded to the throne (‘‘sokui’’).
 Eiman 1, 27th–28th day of the 7th month (1165): The former Emperor Nijō died at age 22.

Kugyō
Kugyō (公卿) is a collective term for the very few most powerful men attached to the court of the Emperor of Japan in pre-Meiji eras.

In general, this elite group included only three to four men at a time.  These were hereditary courtiers whose experience and background would have brought them to the pinnacle of a life's career.  During Nijō's reign, this apex of the  Daijō-kan included: 
 Kampaku, Konoe Motozane, 1143–1166.
 Sadaijin, Konoe Motozane.
 Udaijin
 Nadaijin
 Dainagon

Eras of Nijō's reign
The years of Nijō's reign are more specifically identified by more than one era name or nengō.
 Hōgen    (1156–1159)
 Heiji                 (1159–1160)
 Eiryaku               (1160–1161)
 Ōhō                   (1161–1163)
 Chōkan                (1163–1165)
 Eiman                 (1165–1166)

Ancestry

See also
 Emperor of Japan
 List of Emperors of Japan
 Imperial cult
 Emperor Go-Nijō

Notes

References
 Brown, Delmer M. and Ichirō Ishida, eds. (1979).  Gukanshō: The Future and the Past. Berkeley: University of California Press. ; OCLC 251325323
 Kitagawa, Hiroshi and Burce T. Tsuchida, ed. (1975). The Tale of the Heike. Tokyo: University of Tokyo Press.  OCLC 164803926
 Ponsonby-Fane, Richard Arthur Brabazon. (1959).  The Imperial House of Japan. Kyoto: Ponsonby Memorial Society. OCLC 194887
 Titsingh, Isaac. (1834). Nihon Odai Ichiran; ou,  Annales des empereurs du Japon.  Paris: Royal Asiatic Society, Oriental Translation Fund of Great Britain and Ireland. OCLC 5850691
 Varley, H. Paul. (1980). Jinnō Shōtōki: A Chronicle of Gods and Sovereigns. New York: Columbia University Press. ; OCLC 59145842

Japanese emperors
1143 births
1165 deaths
12th-century Japanese monarchs
People of Heian-period Japan